Armellino is an Italian surname. Notable people with the surname include:

 Michael Armellino (born 1986), Shreds
 Marco Armellino (born 1989), Italian footballer
 Mariano Armellino (1657–1737), Italian Benedictine historian

References 

Italian-language surnames